Herbert Joseph Drury (March 2, 1896 – July 30, 1965) was a Canadian-born American ice hockey defenseman who played six seasons in the National Hockey League for the Pittsburgh Pirates and Philadelphia Quakers. Internationally he played for the American national team at the 1920 Summer Olympics and 1924 Winter Olympics, winning a silver medal both times.

Playing career
Drury was Canadian, he was born in Midland, Ontario in 1895. He came to Pittsburgh, Pennsylvania in 1916 to play for the Pittsburgh Athletic Association hockey team (which later became the Pittsburgh Yellow Jackets of the United States Amateur Hockey Association) at the Duquesne Gardens. From 1918 to 1919 he was called to military service for World War I and did not resume his hockey career until 1920. That season, he represented the United States, as a naturalized citizen on the U.S. Olympic hockey team for the 1920 Summer Olympics. The 1920 Olympic Games, in Antwerp, Belgium, was the debut of hockey to the Olympics, which was added to the existing summer sports. Although the U.S. lost to Canada's Winnipeg Falcons in the finals, Drury returned to the Pittsburgh Yellow Jackets as a silver medalist.

In 1924, Drury once again saw Olympic action as a member of the U.S. Olympic team that played in the first Winter Games at Chamonix, France. As part of the opening ceremonies, Drury carried the U.S. flag for his adopted country. During the games, Drury recorded an astounding 22 goals along with 3 assists, for a total of 25 points in the tournament. After defeating team Sweden 20–0, the U.S. settled for the silver medal following a 6–1 defeat to Canada. Drury scored the lone American goal during the gold medal game.

In October 1925 when Drury became the fifth former Yellow Jackets player sign with the National Hockey League's Pittsburgh Pirates. He played with the Pirates during all of the franchise's five seasons. In 1930, Drury relocated with the team to Philadelphia, where they were known as the Quakers. The Quakers franchise later suspended operations after the 1930–31 NHL season and later folded.

Post-career
Following his retirement from professional hockey Drury became a steamfitter in Pittsburgh and lived there until his death. Drury died on July 30, 1965, aged 70, from undisclosed causes and was interred at Calvary Cemetery, Pittsburgh. In 2010, Herb Drury joined his late brother, University of Southern California football legend Morley Drury, as an inductee of the Midland (Ontario) Sports Hall of Fame, in the Athlete category. Drury's 1924 silver medal and scrapbook documenting his career, are currently on display at the Heinz History Center.

Career statistics

Regular season and playoffs

International

References

External links

1896 births
1965 deaths
American men's ice hockey defensemen
American military personnel of World War I
Burials at Calvary Catholic Cemetery (Pittsburgh)
Canadian emigrants to the United States
Canadian ice hockey defencemen
Ice hockey people from Ontario
Ice hockey players at the 1920 Summer Olympics
Ice hockey players at the 1924 Winter Olympics
Medalists at the 1920 Summer Olympics
Medalists at the 1924 Winter Olympics
Olympic silver medalists for the United States in ice hockey
People from Midland, Ontario
Philadelphia Quakers (NHL) players
Pittsburgh Athletic Association ice hockey players
Pittsburgh Pirates (NHL) players
Pittsburgh Yellow Jackets (USAHA) players